Boughenia Creek is a stream in the U.S. state of Mississippi. It is a tributary to Sand Creek.

Boughenia Creek is a name derived from the Choctaw language meaning "creek at which there is dancing". A variant spelling is "Boughena Creek".

References

Rivers of Mississippi
Rivers of Oktibbeha County, Mississippi
Mississippi placenames of Native American origin